Derek Thompson (born 31 July 1950) is a British presenter and commentator of horse racing on Radio Five Live and At the Races in Britain.

Biography
He was born to Stanley Moorhouse Thompson and Lillian Thompson in Stockton-on-Tees, North Riding of Yorkshire, England. He had an older brother, Howard. Stanley Thompson was a small-time trainer of horses, which gave Derek his first rides as an amateur jockey. Through membership of the local hunt, he met future Grand National winning jockey, Bob Champion and became a lifelong friend.

He attended Guisborough Grammar School and gave his first commentary - on a point-to-point meeting - at the age of 15. After leaving school in 1968, he worked unpaid for Denys Smith, nominally as assistant trainer. After six months, he moved to be assistant to Pierre Sanoner in Chantilly

His broadcasting career began at the age of 18 on local radio. In 1972, he was based in London working for BBC Radio Sport, for whom he covered a number of Grand Nationals alongside Peter Bromley, Michael Seth-Smith and Michael O'Hehir.

In 1981, he moved to ITV, where he appeared on World of Sport and midweek racing coverage. In 1985, he joined the newly formed Channel 4 Racing team as a presenter. He was also part of a team of three who helped to negotiate for the release of the kidnapped Epsom Derby winner Shergar. Thompson also commentates for At The Races and was a regular on talkSPORT radio.

On 26 June 2012 it was announced that Thompson would be stepping down from his duties for a short while as he was to undergo surgery to remove a tumour from near his bowel.
 
In October 2012, it was announced that Thompson would not be staying with Channel 4 Racing when production of the programme moves from High Flyer to IMG in January 2013. The new production company dropped Thompson along with fellow veteran John McCririck. He returned to BBC Radio for the duration of the Cheltenham Festival in 2013.

Thompson is also known for doing an advert for the  Crown Hotel in Bawtry, Doncaster. In the video Thompson is seen saying "Are you well? I thought you were", which attracted the attention of Radio 1 Breakfast presenter Greg James. He since turned it into a meme, including it in songs such as Meduza and Goodboys' "Piece of Your Heart" and Sigala and Becky Hill's "Wish You Well". James met Thompson in person.

References

Bibliography
  

1950 births
Living people
People from Middlesbrough
English radio personalities
Television personalities from Yorkshire
British horse racing writers and broadcasters